Soltan Ab Rural Cooperative ( – Sherket-e Tʿāvanī Tūlīd Rūstāyī-ye Solṭān Āb) is a village in Vakilabad Rural District, in the Central District of Arzuiyeh County, Kerman Province, Iran. At the 2006 census, its population was 32, in 11 families.

References 

Populated places in Arzuiyeh County